The Ridgeland–Oak Park Historic District is a historic district in Oak Park, Illinois that was listed on the National Register of Historic Places in 1983.

The district includes the George W. Smith House, an early example of Frank Lloyd Wright's work as a contributing property.  The house is one of two Frank Lloyd Wright designed buildings within the Ridgeland Historic District and the only residential home; the other structure is the Unity Temple. Otherwise, the historic district lacks examples of Wright's full-fledged Prairie style that are found in abundance in the nearby Frank Lloyd Wright-Prairie School of Architecture Historic District.

The district contains many buildings of merit, including the Oak Park Post Office on Lake Street, designed in 1933 by Charles E. White Jr. and his partner Bertram A. Weber, in 1933, and the Art Deco Medical Arts Building, designed by Oak Park architect Roy J. Hotchkiss.

References

External links

 Ridgeland–Oak Park Historic District (brochure), Oak Park Historic Preservation Commission

Prairie School architecture in Illinois
Oak Park, Illinois
Historic districts on the National Register of Historic Places in Illinois
Buildings and structures on the National Register of Historic Places in Cook County, Illinois